An earthquake occurred on November 3 at  with a magnitude  7.2, or  7.4. The epicenter was located off the Miyagi Prefecture, Japan. Four people were injured and buildings were damaged. In Isobe (磯部) village, nowadays part of Sōma, Fukushima, a small market building collapsed. A tsunami was recorded.

This was one of the recurring interplate earthquakes at the offshore Miyagi with a recurrence interval of about 37 years. Although not officially named by the Japanese Meteorological Agency, in Japanese, this earthquake is commonly known as 1936年宮城県沖地震 (Sen-kyūhyaku-sanjūroku-nen Miyagi-ken-oki Jishin) or 1936年金華山沖地震 (Sen-kyūhyaku-sanjūroku-nen Kinkasan-oki Jishin).

See also
 List of earthquakes in 1936
 List of earthquakes in Japan

References

External links

Miyagi Earthquake, 1936
1936 in Japan
November 1936 events
Earthquakes of the Showa period